John Davys may refer to:
John Davis (explorer) (1550–1605)
John Davys (died 1689) (1646–1689), Irish politician
John Davys (died 1743), Irish MP for Coleraine, Kildare, Charlemont and Carrickfergus

See also

John Davis (disambiguation)
John Davies (disambiguation)
John Davey (disambiguation)
John Davy (disambiguation)